Idda is a neighbourhood in the city of Kristiansand in Agder county, Norway. It is located in the borough of Grim and in the district of Grim. It is located northwest of Bellevue, east of Kolsberg and southwest of Grim torv. Idda Arena is an indoor ice skating hall and a gymnastic hall. Idda is near Grim Junior High and Solholmen Elementary.

References

Geography of Kristiansand
Neighbourhoods of Kristiansand